C.L.Y.D.E. is an animated television series, made by MoonScoop Group (as France Animation), produced by CINAR Animation and created by CINAR's co founder and former president Ronald A. Weinberg and veteran Canadian-French film producer Jean Cazes. It centres around a super-computer from another planet, C.L.Y.D.E. (Computer Linked Yield Driven Entity), which is put on trial for developing a virus called a "sense of humour". He is punished by being launched into space, where he enters Earth's atmosphere and crash-lands. His central core is found, intact, by two kids, Matt and Sam. They install C.L.Y.D.E. into an old jukebox, which makes him able to speak to them, and handle objects through telekinesis. Many of Matt, Sam, and C.L.Y.D.E.'s adventures concern secret agents trying to find C.L.Y.D.E., or defeating computer viruses, hackers, or invading aliens.

This cartoon was introduced into China at the end of the 1990s, and was shown on CCTV-7. The series aired in the United States on the Cookie Jar Toons block on This TV from 2009 to 2010.

Technical Details
French title: CLYDE
Creation: Ronald A. Weinberg , Jean Cazès
Director: Chris Randall
Scenario: Tony Scott, Alan Swayze (supervision), Gilles Taurand , Olivier Massart , Patrick Regnard, Tony Scott
Storyboards: Chris Randall, Tim O'Halloran, Tim Deacon, Vin James
Sets: Frédéric Bremont, Geneviève Chassaing, Michel Herbinet
Framing ( Layout ): Jean-Baptiste Cuvelier, Eric Legeard, Paul-Henri Ferrand, Philippe Jallois, Dominique Lajeunie, Christine Landes, Gérard Lemaux, Benoît Le Pennec, Jean-Noël Malinge, Christophe Pouchot, Alain Remy, Jacques Stoll, Mieke Vermaerke , Gilbert Weppe
Animation: James Appleton, Yannick Barbaud, Corinne Bretel, Claire De Carvalho, Didier Degand, Isabelle Faivre, Jean-Pierre Guzdziol, Philippe Lançon, Franck Marchand, Homa Niknam, Stéphane Piera, Hélène Poldervaart, Frédéric Raducanou, Valérie Schaefer, Jan Van Rijsselberge for Crayon Animation
Music: Leon Aronson
Credits interpreted by Michel Pagliaro
Production: Ronald A. Weinberg, Christian Davin; Micheline Charest , Jean Cazès (executives)
Production companies: CINAR, France Animation, TF1
Country of origin: France / Canada
French language
Format: Colors – 35 mm – 1.33: 1 – mono sound
Number of episodes: 26 (1 season)
Duration: 25 minutes
Date of first broadcast: France  : 1991

French voices
Jacques Ferrière  : CLYDE / the green parasite
Magali Barney  : Samantha / the blue parasite
Nicole Raucher  : Matt
Jean-Claude Donda  : Alberto / the red parasite / secondary characters
Michèle Bardollet  : Gaby
Gérard Rinaldi  : secondary characters
Dubbing artistic direction: Michel Trouillet

Episodes 
Episode 1 C.L.Y.D.E. Makes An Entrance 
Originally Released: 13 September 1990
Characters: C.L.Y.D.E., Matt, Samantha, Alberto
Plot:
Episode 2 Treasure Of Sesemar 
Originally Released: 20 September 1990
Characters: C.L.Y.D.E., Matt, Samantha, Alberto, Egypto-Bugs, Glyph
Plot:
Episode 3 Rock On 
Originally Released: 20 September 1990
Characters: C.L.Y.D.E., Matt, Samantha, Alberto, Lance Eagle, Joey Diamond
Plot:
Episode 4 C.L.Y.D.E. And The Poison Pen 
Originally Released: 27 September 1990
Characters: C.L.Y.D.E., Matt, Samantha, Alberto, Oliver Twitch
Plot:
Episode 5 Bad Dreams 
Originally Released: 27 September 1990
Characters: C.L.Y.D.E., Matt, Samantha, Alberto, Brian
Plot:
Episode 6 Alien Brain Drain 
Originally Released: 4 October 1990
Characters: C.L.Y.D.E., Matt, Samantha, Alberto, Boss, Dross, Waldorf Allcash
Plot:
Episode 7 The Diabolical Dr. Hacker 
Originally Released: 11 October 1990
Characters: C.L.Y.D.E., Matt, Samantha, Alberto, Travis Bulba, Monstro
Plot:
Episode 8 C.L.Y.D.E. Lends A Hand 
Originally Released: 18 October 1990
Characters: C.L.Y.D.E., Matt, Samantha, Alberto, Funny Bunnies, Billy Tyrrell, Silly Squirrel
Plot:
Episode 9 Shoot-out at The High Noon Corral 
Originally Released: 25 October 1990
Characters: C.L.Y.D.E., Matt, Samantha, Alberto
Plot:
Episode 10 Shorty, The Short Order Cook 
Originally Released: 1 November 1990
Characters:  C.L.Y.D.E., Matt, Samantha, Alberto, Shorty, Ruby
Plot:
Episode 11 The Phantom Plane 
Originally Released: 8 November 1990
Characters: C.L.Y.D.E., Matt, Samantha, Alberto, Magnolia de Gouza, General Kastakas
Plot:
Episode 12 C.L.Y.D.E. And Seek 
Originally Released: 15 November 1990
Characters: C.L.Y.D.E., Matt, Samantha, Alberto
Plot:
Episode 13 The Perilous Polar Plot 
Originally Released: 22 November 1990
Characters: C.L.Y.D.E., Matt, Samantha, Alberto, King Cool
Plot:
Episode 14 Al's Big Cook-off 
Originally Released: 6 December 1990
Characters: C.L.Y.D.E., Matt, Samantha, Alberto, Ruby, Chef Gustav, Quizmaster
Plot:
Episode 15 Super Matt 
Originally Released: 13 December 1990
Characters: C.L.Y.D.E., Matt, Samantha, Alberto, Super Kidd, Dr. Diamond
Plot:
Episode 16 Captain Omen 
Originally Released: 20 December 1990
Characters: C.L.Y.D.E., Matt, Samantha, Alberto, Captain Omen
Plot:
Episode 17 A Chip Off The Old C.L.Y.D.E.  
Originally Released: 27 December 1990
Characters: C.L.Y.D.E., Matt, Samantha, Alberto
Plot:
Episode 18 The Princess C.L.Y.D.E. 
Originally Released: 27 December 1990
Characters: C.L.Y.D.E., Matt, Samantha, Alberto, Ruby
Plot:
Episode 19 Painting by Numbers 
Originally Released: 3 January 1991
Characters: 
Plot:
Episode 20 Felony Fair 
Originally Released: January 1991
Characters: C.L.Y.D.E., Matt, Samantha, Alberto, Tom Bell, Robotic Animals, Inspector Bone
Plot:
Episode 21 Heavy Weather 
Originally Released: 10 January 1991
Characters: C.L.Y.D.E., Matt, Samantha, Alberto, Corsican Brothers (Leon, Zappo), Professor Storm
Plot:
Episode 22 King Klang 
Originally Released: 17 January 1991
Characters: C.L.Y.D.E., Matt, Samantha, Alberto, Ruby, J.C. Crassburger, Rita Romero
Plot:
Episode 23 No Place Like Home 
Originally Released: 7 February 1991
Characters: C.L.Y.D.E., Matt, Samantha, Alberto, Professor Gordon
Plot:
Episode 24 Bird Bandits 
Originally Released: February 1991
Characters: C.L.Y.D.E., Matt, Samantha, Alberto, Rosa
Plot:
Episode 25 Get That C.L.Y.D.E.! 
Originally Released: 14 February 1991
Characters: C.L.Y.D.E., Matt, Samantha, Alberto, X28
Plot:
Episode 26 Double Trouble 
Originally Released: 14 February 1991
Characters: C.L.Y.D.E., Matt, Samantha, Alberto, Alberto's Look-Alike, Waldorf Allcash, Le Ratt
Plot:

References 

1990 Canadian television series debuts
1991 Canadian television series endings
1990s Canadian animated television series
1990s Canadian science fiction television series
Canadian children's animated science fantasy television series
French children's animated science fantasy television series
Television series by Cookie Jar Entertainment
Family Channel (Canadian TV network) original programming
English-language television shows
TF1 original programming
YTV (Canadian TV channel) original programming